Rubén Darío Insúa Carballo (born 17 April 1961) is an Argentine football manager and former player who played mainly as an attacking midfielder. He is the current manager of San Lorenzo.

Insúa represented the Argentina national team several times. During his playing career, he earned the nickname "el Poeta del Futbol" (the Poet of Football).

Playing career
Insúa was born in Buenos Aires. He played most of his career in the Argentine top league. He was part of the Independiente team that won the 1988–89 Primera title. He also played for Barcelona in Ecuador and Deportivo Cali in Colombia, and had a spell with Spanish side UD Las Palmas.

Style of play
As a player, Insúa was regarded as a swift midfielder with an excellent touch and a penchant for scoring from free kicks. These qualities earned him his nicknames "el Poeta del Gol" (the Goal Poet) and "el Poeta del Futbol" (the Football Poet). Although he was primarily an attacking midfielder, he was also capable of playing as a striker.

Managerial career
Insúa coached for Ecuador's Barcelona to a national title in 1997, and the Copa Libertadores finals in 1998. He coached San Lorenzo de Almagro to the Copa Sudamericana 2002 title.

Insúa coached Ecuador's Deportivo Quito to the 2009 Campeonato Ecuatoriano de Fútbol Serie A title.

On 1 October 2010, Insúa reached a verbal agreement with Barcelona's president Eduardo Maruri to return and coach the club that won his last national title achievement in 1997. On 25 March 2011, he was fired from Barcelona and replaced with Alex Aguinaga.

Insúa was Deportivo Cali's manager since approximately October 2011 until 4 March 2012.

Managerial statistics

Honours

Player
Independiente
Primera: 1988–89.

Manager
Barcelona Sporting Club
Serie A: 1997

San Lorenzo
Copa Sudamericana: 2002

Deportivo Quito
Serie A: 2009

References

External links

Living people
1961 births
Footballers from Buenos Aires
Association football midfielders
Association football forwards
Argentine footballers
Argentina international footballers
1983 Copa América players
San Lorenzo de Almagro footballers
Deportivo Cali footballers
Club Atlético Independiente footballers
Estudiantes de La Plata footballers
Barcelona S.C. footballers
Quilmes Atlético Club footballers
UD Las Palmas players
La Liga players
Argentine Primera División players
Categoría Primera A players
Ecuadorian Serie A players
Argentine expatriate footballers
Argentine expatriate sportspeople in Spain
Argentine expatriate sportspeople in Colombia
Expatriate footballers in Colombia
Expatriate footballers in Ecuador
Expatriate footballers in Spain
Argentine football managers
Ferro Carril Oeste managers
Talleres de Córdoba managers
San Lorenzo de Almagro managers
Barcelona S.C. managers
C.D. Jorge Wilstermann managers
Club Alianza Lima managers
C.D. El Nacional managers
Deportivo Cali managers
Deportivo Binacional FC managers
Argentine expatriate sportspeople in Ecuador
Argentine expatriate sportspeople in Peru
S.D. Quito managers